Thermosipho is a genus of Gram-negative staining, anaerobic, and mostly thermophilic and hyperthermophilic bacteria in the family Thermotogaceae.

Species
 Thermosipho africanus (Huber, Woese, Langworthy, Fricke & Stetter) emend. Ravot, Ollivier, Patel, Magot & Garcia, 1996
 Thermosipho atlanticus Urios, Cueff-Gauchard, Pignet, Postec, Fardeau, Ollivier & Barbier, 2004
 Thermosipho japonicus Takai & Horikoshi, 2000
 Thermosipho melanesiensis Antoine, Cilia, Meunier, Guezennec, Lesongeur & Barbier, 1997

References

 Huber, R., Woese, C.R., Langworthy, T.A., Fricke, H., and Stetter, K.O. "Thermosipho africanus gen. nov., represents a new genus of thermophilic eubacteria within the 'thermotogales'." Syst. Appl. Microbiol. (1989) 12:32-37
 Ravot, G., Ollivier, B., Patel, B.K.C., Magot, M., and Garcia, J.L. "Emended description of Thermosipho africanus as a carbohydrate-fermenting species using thiosulfate as an electron acceptor." Int. J. Syst. Bacteriol. (1996) 46:321-323

Thermotogota
Gram-negative bacteria
Anaerobes
Eukaryote genera
Thermophiles
Bacteria described in 1989